= Hans Berndtsson =

Swedish footballer

Personal information
- Full name: Hans Berndtsson
- Date of birth: 5 March 1956 (age 70)
- Place of birth: Sweden
- Position: Defender

Senior career*
Years	Team	Apps	(Gls)
1979–1982	BK Häcken	74	(0)
1982-1991	Örgryte IS	180	(1)

International career
1981-1982	Sweden	5	(0)
- * Club domestic league appearances and goals

Hans Berndtsson (born 5 March 1956) is a Swedish former football player.

During his club career, Berndtsson played for BK Häcken and Örgryte IS.

Berndtsson made five appearances for the Sweden men's national football team, between 1981 and 1982.
